Lan Yinong (1919 – February 14, 2008) original name Lan Yenong, was a  politician of the People's Republic of China. He was born in Chaling County, Hunan Province. He was Chinese Communist Party Committee Secretary and Mayor of Chongqing. He was also the Chinese Communist Party Committee Secretary and Governor of Guizhou Province.

1919 births
2008 deaths
People's Republic of China politicians from Hunan
Chinese Communist Party politicians from Hunan
Mayors of Chongqing
Political office-holders in Chongqing
Governors of Guizhou
Political office-holders in Guizhou
People's Liberation Army officers
Alternate members of the 9th Central Committee of the Chinese Communist Party
Politicians from Zhuzhou